Meech Wells (born Cecil Demetrius Womack Jr.) is an American record producer.  He works primarily on hip hop music, and has produced or co-produced for Snoop Dogg and Shaquille O'Neal.

Biography
Before becoming Snoop's producer of choice during the late 1990s and early 2000s, Wells began his career as part of a funk band, Trey Lewd, that also featured Tracey Lewis, George Clinton's son; this provided Wells with the opportunity to work with Clinton himself. By 1993, Wells found himself working alongside Def Jef; the two's production on Shaquille O'Neal's "I Got Skillz" earned them some credentials. Throughout the mid-1990s, Wells continued to hone his craft, working on a number of remix projects before eventually being introduced to Snoop through a friend. Before long, the two were working together, beginning with "Still a G Thang," one of the songs on Snoop's Da Game Is to Be Sold, Not to Be Told. Wells produced a few No Limit songs featuring Snoop — Tru's "It's a Beautiful Thang," Silkk the Shocker's "Get It Up" — before playing a major role in bringing a West Coast sound to Snoop's No Limit Top Dogg album in 1999. In 2000, Wells reprised his role as one of Snoop's producers of choice, producing tracks for Tha Eastsidaz' self-titled debut and Doggy's Angels' Pleezbalevit, as well as on two tracks on  Snoop's own Tha Last Meal ("Go Away," "Issues").

Produced songs and collaborations
 "I Got Skillz" by Shaquille O'Neal (co-produced with Def Jef)
 3/21 tracks on Da Game Is to Be Sold Not to Be Told by Snoop Dogg
 6/22 tracks on No Limit Top Dogg by Snoop Dogg
 4/22 tracks on Snoop Dogg Presents Tha Eastsidaz by Tha Eastsidaz
 3/20 tracks on Duces 'N Trayz: The Old Fashioned Way by Snoop Dogg
 2/19 tracks on Pleezbaleevit! by Doggy's Angels
 2/19 tracks on Tha Last Meal by Snoop Dogg
 2/17 tracks on Executive Decision by Bad Azz
 "Wanna Be Gangsta" by The Comrads Featuring Soul
 "Innocent Man" (West Coast Remix) by Mark Morrison ft. DMX, Eastwood & Kokane

Filmography
 Unsung: Mary Wells (#6.11) (2011) TV Episode [Actor .... Himself]
 King's Ransom (2005) [Soundtrack] (writer: "Worst Nightmare")
 Hollywood Homicide (2003) [Soundtrack] (writer: "Bang This")
 What's the Worst That Could Happen? (2001) [Soundtrack] (writer: "F**k What They Say", "In-A-Zone Drama") (performer: "In-A-Zone Drama")

Projects

 1993  NBA Jam Session Various Artists  Producer
 1993  Shaq Diesel Shaquille O'Neal  Producer
 1994  Above the Rim Original Soundtrack  Remixing
 1996  Best of Shaquille O'Neal Shaquille O'Neal  Producer
 1997  It's a Groove (Jump, Stomp, Pomp, Romp) Hot Motion  Mixing, Producer
 1997  Bootyrama Hot Motion  Mixing, Producer, Multi Instruments
 1998  Da Game Is to Be Sold, Not to Be Told [Clean] Snoop Dogg  Producer
 1998  Game Is to Be Sold Not to Be Told Snoop Dogg  Producer
 1998  Black Mafia Steady Mobb'n  Producer
 1998  No Limit Soldiers Compilation: We Can't Be Stopped Various Artists  Producer
 1999  P.J.'s [Clean] Original TV Soundtrack  Producer
 1999  No Limit Top Dogg [Clean] Snoop Dogg  Producer
 1999  Who U Wit? No Limit All Stars  Producer
 1999  Da Crime Family Tru  Producer
 1999  Da Crime Family [Clean] Tru  Producer
 1999  Thicker Than Water Original Soundtrack  Producer
 1999  Thicker Than Water [Clean] Original Soundtrack  Producer
 1999  Hempin' Ain't Easy B-Legit  Engineer, Producer
 1999  Hempin' Ain't Easy B-Legit  Producer, Engineer, Composer
 2000  Tha Eastsidaz Snoop Dogg  Producer
 2000  Tha Eastsidaz Snoop Dogg  Composer, Producer
 2000  Tha Eastsidaz [Clean] Snoop Dogg  Producer
 2000  Wake Up & Ball The Comrads  Producer
 2000  Pleezbalevit Snoop Dogg  Producer
 2000  Tha Last Meal Snoop Dogg  Producer
 2000  Tha Last Meal Snoop Dogg  Producer
 2000  Tha Last Meal Snoop Dogg  Producer, Composer
 2000  Tha Last Meal Snoop Dogg  Composer
 2000  Tha Last Meal [Clean] Snoop Dogg  Producer
 2001  Oz Original TV Soundtrack  Producer
 2001  Brothers [2001] Original Soundtrack  Producer, Keyboards
 2001  Brothers [2001] Original Soundtrack  Producer, Composer, Keyboards
 2001  What's the Worst That Could Happen? Original Soundtrack  A&R, Drum Programming, Instrumentation, Engineer, Producer
 2001  Duces n' Trays: The Old Fashioned Way Tha Eastsidaz  Producer
 2001  Duces n' Trays: The Old Fashioned Way Tha Eastsidaz  Producer
 2001  Duces n' Trays: The Old Fashioned Way [Clean] Tha Eastsidaz  Producer
 2001  Chase the Cat Too Short  Producer, Keyboards, Drum Programming
 2002  Best of Nas Nas  Remixing
 2002  From Illmatic to Stillmatic: The Remixes [EP] Nas  Remixing
 2002  Snoop Dogg Presents Doggy Style Allstars: Welcome to tha House, Vol. 1 [Clean] Snoop Dogg  Producer
 2002  General's List Big Tray Deee  Producer
 2002  General's List [Clean] Big Tray Deee  Producer
 2002  Paid tha Cost to Be Da Bo$$ Snoop Dogg  Producer
 2002  Paid tha Cost to Be da Bo$$ [Clean] Snoop Dogg  Producer
 2003  DPGC: U Know What I'm Throwin' Up Daz Dillinger  Composer, Producer
 2003  DPGC: U Know What I'm Throwin' Up [Clean] Daz Dillinger  Composer, Producer
 2003  Executive Decision Bad Azz  Producer
 2004  Bugzy Bugzy  Producer
 2004  City 2 City Various Artists  Producer
 2004  Parallel Chico & Coolwadda  Producer
 2005  Best of Snoop Dogg Snoop Dogg  Producer, Composer
 2005  Best of Snoop Dogg Snoop Dogg  Composer, Producer
 2005  Best of Snoop Dogg [Clean] Snoop Dogg  Producer
 2006  Club Bangers Various Artists  Producer
 2007  G-Party [Circuit City Exclusive] Various Artists  Composer
 2011  Doggumentary Snoop Dogg  Producer
 2011  Doggumentary Snoop Dogg  Producer
 2011  Doggumentary [Clean] Snoop Dogg  Producer

References

External links

Living people
American record producers
Year of birth missing (living people)